Super Sun S.C is a Sri Lankan professional football club based in Beruwala in the Kalutara District. The team plays in Sri Lanka Champions League, the top division of domestic football.

League participations
Sri Lanka Champions League: 2012–
Kit Premier League Division I: 2011–12
Kit Premier League Division II: –2011

Stadium
Currently the team plays at the 1,000 capacity Zahira College Ground.

See also
2010–11 Sri Lanka Football Division II
2013 Sri Lanka Football Premier League

References

External links
 Soccerway

Football clubs in Sri Lanka